Joel Krautter (born December 8, 1987) is an American politician and attorney in Montana. Krautter is a Republican member of the Montana House of Representatives from the 35th district. In Krautter’s first legislative term he passed four bills into law and was a champion for business, agriculture  and mental health services, receiving recognition by the Montana Chamber of Commerce, Montana Farm Bureau Federation and Disability Rights Montana. Krautter also restored an increase in oil and gas revenue to eastern Montana communities.  He has been recognized as one of the Capitol’s most visible bipartisan legislators. Other issues Krautter worked on at the legislature included legislation to revitalize the economies of rural Montana communities through the "Catch and Keep Montana's Treasure Act," as well as bipartisan prescription drug price transparency legislation with Representative Katie Sullivan and a grant program to fund mobile crisis units to help people with a mental crisis, with Senator Edie McClafferty.

Early life 
Joel Krautter grew up in Deer Lodge, Montana, graduating from Powell County High School, where he helped lead the golf team to two state championships in 2005 and 2007.

Education 
In 2011, Krautter earned a Bachelor of Science degree in Government: Pre-law from Liberty University, a private evangelical Christian university in Lynchburg, Virginia. While at Liberty University, Krautter was involved in campus politics. He was briefly involved with both the college democrats and college republicans while at Liberty. He was also involved in pro-Israel activism, serving as president of the university’s Stand with Israel club. Krautter was elected president of the graduating class of 2011. In 2014, Krautter earned a JD degree from University of Montana School of Law.

Career 

Krautter first ran for office in 2016, challenging incumbent Scott Staffanson for MT House District 35 in the Republican primary. Staffanson would win re-election, although Krautter in his first campaign would capture 40% of the vote against the lifelong Sidney resident. During the campaign Krautter wrote an op-ed that discussed why he was a Republican.

Krautter was subsequently elected chairman of the Richland County Republican Central Committee in 2017.

In 2018, Krautter ran for the open House District 35 seat after Staffanson retired, defeating Tanya Rost in the Republican primary.

On November 6, 2018, Krautter won the general election, running unopposed and became a Republican member of Montana House of Representatives for District 35.

Montana State Legislature

2016 State House of Representatives election

In 2016, Krautter was unsuccessful in the Republican Party primary.

2018 State House of Representatives election

Krautter was elected in the 2018 Republican primary over Tanya Rost.

Krautter was uncontested in the general election, having received 3,688 votes.

2020 State House of Representatives election
Krautter was defeated for re-election in the 2020 Primary.

Awards 
 2019 Rookie of the Year Award. Presented by Montana Farm Bureau Federation.
 Champion of Business Award. Presented by Montana Chamber of Commerce.
 Spirit Award. Presented by Disability Rights Montana.
 Hero Award. Presented by National Association of Mental Illness, Montana Chapter.

Personal life 
In August 2014, Krautter moved to Sidney, Montana after graduating from law school.

References

External links 
 Joel Krautter at ourcampaigns.com
 Joel Krautter at muckrack.com

Living people
1987 births
21st-century American politicians
Liberty University alumni
Republican Party members of the Montana House of Representatives
People from Deer Lodge, Montana
People from Sidney, Montana